D.Gray-man is an anime series adapted from the manga of the same title by Katsura Hoshino. Produced by TMS Entertainment and directed by Osamu Nabeshima, the series follows the adventures of Allen Walker, an exorcist that wields the power of "Innocence" in order to fight against the Millennium Earl, an ancient sorcerer seeking to destroy the world with monsters called akuma.

The episodes began airing on October 3, 2006 in Japan on TV Tokyo. The first season of the anime, known as the "1st stage", aired for 51 episodes, finishing its run on September 25, 2007. The second season, known as the "2nd stage", began airing on October 2, 2007, and finished its run on September 30, 2008, lasting 52 episodes. In 2008, Funimation acquired the series for an English-language release in North America and reformatted the series into four separate seasons. In June 2016, Funimation acquired the rights to the second half of the anime. A sequel titled D.Gray-man Hallow premiered in Japan in July 2016.

Twelve pieces of theme music are used for the series: four opening themes and eight closing themes. Singles have been released of the individual songs, and three original soundtracks, each containing tracks of the series' theme music, have been released on March 21, 2007, December 19, 2007, and December 17, 2008 respectively.

Twenty-six DVD compilations have been released by Aniplex between the first on February 7, 2007 and the latest on March 4, 2009. The first thirteen compilations contain episodes of the first season, and all successive compilations have episodes of the second season. On March 31, 2009, Funimation released the first thirteen episodes of the anime as a DVD compilation. The next thirteen episodes were released on June 23, 2009, and on Blu-ray released on January 5, 2010.

Episode list

Season 1 (2006–07)

Season 2 (2007)

Season 3 (2007–08)

Season 4 (2008)

Hallow (2016)

Home media release
The DVD compilations of the D.Gray-man anime are released by Aniplex. As of September 2008, only Region 2 DVD compilations have been released in Japan. Thirteen DVD compilations of the first season, all containing four episodes except the thirteenth DVD compilation (three episodes), have been released by Aniplex between February 7, 2007 and February 6, 2008. Thirteen DVD compilations of the second season, each containing four episodes, have been released, the last on March 4, 2009. Funimation released the first thirteen episodes of the anime as a DVD compilation on March 31, 2009 and the next thirteen episodes were released on June 23, 2009. Funimation's home media release listed four seasons instead of Aniplex's two "stage" seasons.

Region 1

North America

Region 2

Japan

1st Stage

2nd Stage

United Kingdom

References 
General

}
}

Specific

External links
Official website 
Official TMS Entertainment website for the anime 
Official TV Tokyo website for the anime 

Lists of anime episodes